Ephedra pedunculata, common name Clap-weed, vine Mormon tea or Comida de Vívora, is a plant species native to southern Texas and to Mexico as far south as Zacatecas. It grows in sandy or rocky slopes and outcrops.

Bark is gray, becoming cracked with age. Microsporangial (pollen-producing cones) are 1–2 mm long, compared to less than 1 mm in many other species.

References

pedunculata
Plants described in 1883
Flora of Texas
Flora of Mexico